Night Hunter is a 1996 horror film directed by Rick Jacobson featuring a struggle between vampires and humans.

Plot
Jack Cutter (Don "Dragon" Wilson) is the last in long line of vampire hunters. After killing a few vampires in one L.A. restaurant, he is chased both by police and by other vampires.

References

External links
 
  
 

1996 films
American supernatural horror films
American vampire films
1996 horror films
1990s action horror films
American action horror films
American vigilante films
American films about revenge
American martial arts films
Martial arts horror films
1996 martial arts films
1990s vigilante films
Films shot in Los Angeles
Films set in Los Angeles
American exploitation films
Films scored by Terry Plumeri
1990s English-language films
Films directed by Rick Jacobson
1990s American films